Olepa anomi is a moth of the family Erebidae first described by Orhant in 1986. It is found in Sri Lanka.

References

Spilosomina
Moths described in 1986